Basketball was one of the 16 sports disciplines held in the 1974 Asian Games in Tehran, Iran. Israel won their 2nd title by beating the defending champions South Korea in the championship match. This is also the first time that women's edition were held, and Japan emerged as the first-ever champions after a round-robin format. The games were held from September 2 to 15, 1974.

Medalists

Medal table

Draw
The draw was held in Tehran. The men were drawn into four groups of three teams but India later withdrew, the women were played in round robin format.

Group 1

Group 2

Group 3

Group 4

Results

Men

Preliminary round

Group 1

Group 2

Group 3

Group 4

Classification 9th–11th

Second round

Group A

Group B

Classification 5th–8th

Semi-finals

7th place game

5th place game

Final round

Semifinals

Bronze medal game

Final

Final standing

Women

References 
 Results
 Results

 
Basketball
1974
1974 in Asian basketball
International basketball competitions hosted by Iran